An integrally-convex set is the discrete geometry analogue of the concept of convex set in geometry.

A subset X of the integer grid  is integrally convex if any point y in the convex hull of X can be expressed as a convex combination of the points of X that are "near" y, where "near" means that the distance between each two coordinates is less than 1.

Definitions 

These are the integer points that are considered "nearby" to the real point y.

Example 

Let n = 2 and let X = { (0,0), (1,0), (2,0), (2,1) }. Its convex hull ch(X) contains, for example, the point y = (1.2, 0.5).

The integer points nearby y are near(y) = {(1,0), (2,0), (1,1), (2,1) }. So X ∩ near(y) = {(1,0), (2,0), (2,1)}. But y is not in ch(X ∩ near(y)). See image at the right. 

Therefore X is not integrally-convex.  

In contrast, the set Y = { (0,0), (1,0), (2,0), (1,1), (2,1) } is integrally-convex.

Properties 
Iimura, Murota and Tamura have shown the following property of integrally-convex set.

Let  be a finite integrally-convex set. There exists a triangulation of ch(X) that is integral, i.e.:

 The vertices of the triangulation are the vertices of X;
 The vertices of every simplex of the triangulation lie in the same "cell" (hypercube of side-length 1) of the integer grid .

The example set X is not integrally-convex, and indeed ch(X) does not admit an integral triangulation: every triangulation of ch(X), either has to add vertices not in X, or has to include simplices that are not contained in a single cell.

In contrast, the set Y = { (0,0), (1,0), (2,0), (1,1), (2,1) } is integrally-convex, and indeed admits an integral triangulation, e.g. with the three simplices {(0,0),(1,0),(1,1)} and {(1,0),(2,0),(2,1)} and {(1,0),(1,1),(2,1)}. See image at the right.

References 

Discrete geometry